Cofie is a surname. Notable people with the surname include:

 Ethel Delali Cofie, Ghanaian IT professional, entrepreneur and consultant
 Isaac Cofie (born 1991), Ghanaian footballer
 Joe Cofie (born 1946), Ghanaian boxer
 John Cofie (born 1993), Ghanaian-born British footballer

See also
 Coffee (disambiguation)
 Coffey (disambiguation)